Big Country is a Scottish rock band.

Big Country or The Big Country may also refer to:

 The Big Country (Hamilton novel), a 1958 novel by Donald Hamilton
 The Big Country, a 1958 American western film adaptation of the novel 
 The Big Country (comics), a comic book adaptation of the film
 The Big Country (Timms novel), a 1962 novel by E. V. Timms, completed by his wife Alma Timms
 "Big Country", a song by Bela Fleck and the Flecktones from Left of Cool
 "The Big Country", a song by Talking Heads from More Songs About Buildings and Food
 "The Big Country", the greater metropolitan area of Abilene, Texas and surrounding counties

People nicknamed Big Country:
 Brad Eldred (born 1980), American baseball player
 Roy Nelson (fighter) (born 1976), American mixed martial arts fighter
 Bryant Reeves (born 1973), American retired basketball player
 Kyle Rudolph (born 1989), American football player

Lists of people by nickname